Kings Park is a hamlet and census-designated place (CDP) in the Town of Smithtown, in Suffolk County, on Long Island, in New York, United States. The population was 17,282 as of the 2010 census.

Its relative tranquility prompted it to be the site of the Kings Park Psychiatric Center instead of New York City.

Geography

Kings Park is bordered by Nissequogue to its east across the Nissequogue River, by Fort Salonga to its west, by Commack to its southwest, and by the hamlet of Smithtown to its southeast.

Demographics

As of the census of 2010, there were 17,282 people and 6,212 households residing in the CDP. The population density was 2,787.4 per square mile (1,073.4/km2). There were 6,469 housing units at an average density of 1,043.4/sq mi (401.8/km2). The racial makeup of the CDP was 80.1% White, 5.1% African American, 0.1% Native American, 8.4% Asian, 0.02% Pacific Islander, 4.9% some other race, and 1.3% from two or more races. Hispanic or Latino of any race were 16.3% of the population.

There were 6,212 households in 2010, out of which 34.6% had children under the age of 18 living with them, 60.2% were headed by married couples living together, 9.4% had a female householder with no husband present, and 27.1% were non-families. 23.3% of all households were made up of individuals, and 12.1% were someone living alone who was 65 years of age or older. The average household size was 2.71, and the average family size was 3.24.

In the CDP, the population was spread out, with 23.3% under the age of 18, 6.6% from 18 to 24, 23.4% from 25 to 44, 29.4% from 45 to 64, and 17.2% who were 65 years of age or older. The median age was 43.3 years. For every 100 females, there were 93.7 males. For every 100 females age 18 and over, there were 90.8 males.

Over the period 2007-2011, the median annual income for a household in the CDP was $92,921, and the median income for a family was $106,128. Males had a median income of $78,882 versus $55,872 for females. The per capita income for the CDP was $37,980. About 1.6% of families and 3.3% of the population were below the poverty line, including 2.6% of those under age 18 and 6.3% of those age 65 or over.

Kings Park is largely a Catholic community, with nearly 60% identifying as Catholic. The town parish, St. Joseph’s has the largest census population of all religious communities in the Town of Smithtown. The current pastor is Father Peter J. Dugandzic and has been in service since June 26, 2019.

Landmarks 
Sunken Meadow State Park borders Long Island Sound and is accessible by the Sunken Meadow State Parkway. It is a part of the New York State Parks system. In addition to the water, the park has  of public trails and 27 holes of golf. The park's facilities are used for different activities, among them various distance running competitions. "Cardiac Hill" is well known by local runners.

The Nissequogue River,  in length, empties into Long Island Sound and is used for different types of water activities. The river flows through the Nissequogue River State Park.

Kings Park Bluff, sandwiched between Sunken Meadow State Park and Short Beach in Smithtown sits the Kings Park Bluff which empties into the Long Island Sound. Used as a boat launch and a popular fishing location for locals.

Kings Park is home to Leo P. Ostebo Kings Park Heritage Museum, the only school community managed town heritage museum in the United States, which is located in the first school building built in 1928.

Notable people
The Carlson Family - In the 1950s, the Carlson family revolutionized human waste disposal with a number of highly innovative inventions that were manufactured and sold in Kings Park and whose patented plans were used throughout the world. The two main inventions are the precast concrete cesspool and the precast concrete septic tank. There are several additional inventions for these two main products including their underground arrangement, metal manufacturing molds, and lifting apparatuses for loading and installation. These precast concrete cesspools and septic tanks are still manufactured and in use today worldwide. 

Kings Park is the hometown of Houston Astros catcher/second baseman/outfielder Craig Biggio. Biggio was named one of the five greatest second basemen of all time by baseball statistician Bill James. He is also the modern-era record-holder for HBPs with 273, and the first player in history to be named an All-Star at both the catcher and second baseman positions. Biggio was elected into the National Baseball Hall of Fame in 2015. Kings Park High School named their men's varsity baseball field after Craig Biggio.

Three original members of the progressive metal band Dream Theater were raised in Kings Park, including guitarist John Petrucci, bassist John Myung, and keyboardist Kevin Moore.

References

External links

 Kings Park Chamber of Commerce
 Kings Park Central School District
 Kings Park Heritage Museum
 Kings Park Civic Association 
 Kings Park Psychiatric Center: A Journey Through History, by Jason Medina
 Kings Park Psychiatric Center, by Chris Marshall, including a high-quality PDF map and a photo essay of the abandoned hospital
 KPPC History, by Robert Saal: photo collection

Smithtown, New York
Census-designated places in New York (state)
Long Island Sound
Census-designated places in Suffolk County, New York
Populated coastal places in New York (state)